The Unknown Gods is a supplement for fantasy role-playing games published by Judges Guild in 1980.

Contents
The Unknown Gods is a supplement briefly describing 83 gods and deities, all illustrated by Jennell Jaquays.

The Unknown Gods is a compendium of original deities not specifically drawn from real mythologies. Each god or goddess is set up as per Deities and Demigods, with the addition of a disposition chart.

Publication history
The Unknown Gods was written by Bob Bledsaw, Mark Holmer, Jennell Jaquays, and Mike Petrowsky, and was published by Judges Guild in 1980 as a 48-page book.

TSR opted not to renew Judges Guild's license for D&D when it expired in September 1980. The Book of Treasure Maps II (1980) and The Unknown Gods (1980) were among Judges Guild’s final products that bore the older D&D logo.

Reception
Aaron Allston, reviewing The Unknown Gods in The Space Gamer No. 38, stated that the described deities are generally original and well presented, and have elegant and useful game mechanics; on the other hand, some examples were rather dull, and the book as a whole was quite fragmented. Allston concludes his review by saying, "This could be a useful volume, especially for DMs whose players are too familiar with the traditional gods. I'd recommend it to referees who suffer from a difficulty in creating deities."

Notes

References

Judges Guild fantasy role-playing game supplements
Role-playing game supplements introduced in 1980